HZD may refer to:

 Carroll County Airport (Tennessee) (FAA LID: HZD), a county-owned, public-use airport in Carroll County, Tennessee
 Hazaribagh Road railway station (station code: HZD), a railway station on the Grand Chord line of East Central Railway
 Movement for Democracy, a political party in Slovakia
 Horizon Zero Dawn, a video game released in 2017